Raelynn may refer to:

RaeLynn, stage name of American singer Racheal Lynn Woodward (born 1994)
Raelyn Campbell, Senior Program Officer for the Asia-Pacific Region at the Bill and Melinda Gates Foundation
Raelynn Hillhouse,  American national security and Intelligence community analyst, former smuggler during the  Cold War,  spy novelist and health care executive.
Rae Lynn Job, American politician

Other uses
Raelynn (given name)